Pool of Radiance is a role-playing video game developed and published by Strategic Simulations, Inc (SSI) in 1988. It was the first adaptation of TSR's Advanced Dungeons & Dragons (AD&D) fantasy role-playing game for home computers, becoming the first episode in a four-part series of D&D computer adventure games. The other games in the "Gold Box" series used the game engine pioneered in Pool of Radiance, as did later D&D titles such as the Neverwinter Nights online game. Pool of Radiance takes place in the Forgotten Realms fantasy setting, with the action centered in and around the port city of Phlan.

Just as in traditional D&D games, the player starts by building a party of up to six characters, deciding the race, gender, class, and ability scores for each. The player's party is enlisted to help the settled part of the city by clearing out the marauding inhabitants that have taken over the surroundings. The characters move on from one area to another, battling bands of enemies as they go and ultimately confronting the powerful leader of the evil forces. During play, the player characters gain experience points, which allow them to increase their capabilities. The game primarily uses a first-person perspective, with the screen divided into sections to display pertinent textual information. During combat sequences, the display switches to a top-down "video game isometric" view.

Generally well received by the gaming press, Pool of Radiance won the Origins Award for "Best Fantasy or Science Fiction Computer Game of 1988". Some reviewers criticized the game's similarities to other contemporary games and its slowness in places, but praised the game's graphics and its role-playing adventure and combat aspects. Also well-regarded was the ability to export player characters from Pool of Radiance to subsequent SSI games in the series.

Gameplay
Pool of Radiance is based on the same game mechanics as the Advanced Dungeons & Dragons rule set. As in many role-playing games (RPGs), each player character in Pool of Radiance has a character race and a character class, determined at the beginning of the game. Six races are offered, including elves and halflings, as well as four classes (fighter, cleric, magic-user, and thief). Non-human characters have the option to become multi-classed, which means they gain the capabilities of more than one class, but advance in levels more slowly. During character creation, the computer randomly generates statistics for each character, although the player can alter these attributes. The player also chooses each character's alignment, or moral philosophy; while the player controls each character's actions, alignment can affect how NPCs view their actions. The player can then customize the appearance and colors of each character's combat icon. Alternatively, the player can load a pre-generated party to be used for introductory play. These characters are combined into a party of six or less, with two slots open for NPCs. Players create their own save-game files, assuring character continuation regardless of events in the game. On an DOS computer, the game can be copied to the hard-disk drive. Other computer systems, such as the Commodore 64, require a separate save-game disk.

The game's "exploration" mode uses a three-dimensional first-person perspective, with a rectangle in the top left of the screen displaying the party's current view; the rest of the screen displays text information about the party and the area. During gameplay, the player accesses menus to allow characters to use objects; trade items with other characters; parley with enemies; buy, sell, and pool the characters' money; cast spells, and learn new magic skills. Players can view characters' movement from different angles, including an aerial view. The game uses three different versions of each sprite to indicate differences between short-, medium-, and long-range encounters.

In combat mode, the screen changes to a top-down mode with dimetric projection, where the player decides what actions the characters will take in each round. These actions are taken immediately, rather than after all commands have been issued as is standard in some RPGs. Optionally, the player can let the computer choose character moves for each round. Characters and monsters may make an extra attack on a retreating enemy that moves next to them. If a character's hit points (HP) fall below zero, he or she must be bandaged by another character or the character will die. The game contains random encounters, and game reviewers for Dragon magazine observed that random encounters seem to follow standard patterns of encounter tables in pen and paper AD&D game manuals. They also observed that the depictions of monsters confronting the party "looked as though they had jumped from the pages of the Monster Manual".

Different combat options are available to characters based on class. For example, fighters can wield melee or ranged weapons; magic-users can cast spells; thieves have the option to "back-stab" an opponent by strategically positioning themselves. As fighters progress in level, they can attack more than once in a round. Fighters also gain the ability to "sweep" enemies, effectively attacking each nearby low-level creature in the same turn. Magic-users and clerics are allowed to memorize and cast a set number of spells each day. Once cast, a spell must be memorized again before reuse. The process requires hours of inactivity for all characters, during which they rest in a camp; this also restores lost hit points to damaged characters. This chore of memorizing spells each night significantly added to the amount of game management required by the player.

As characters defeat enemies, they gain experience points (XP). After gaining enough XP, the characters "train up a level" to become more powerful. This training is purchased in special areas within the city walls. In addition to training, mages can learn new spells by transcribing them from scrolls found in the unsettled areas. Defeated enemies in these areas also contain items such as weapons and armor, which characters can sell to city stores.

Copy protection
The DOS, Macintosh and Apple II versions of Pool of Radiance include a 2-ply code wheel for translating elvish and dwarven runes to English. Some dwarven runes have multiple different translations. After the title screen, a copy protection screen is displayed consisting of two runes and a line of varying appearance (a dotted line, a dashed line, or a line with alternating dots and dashes) which correspond to markings on the code wheel. The player is prompted to enter a five or six character code which corresponds to a five or six character word. In the case of a five character word, there is a number at the beginning of the word which is not entered. Under the lines on the wheel are slots which reveal English letters, the coded English word being determined by lining up the runes, matching the correct line appearance, and then entering the word revealed on the code wheel. If the player enters an incorrect code three times, the game closes itself. In the DOS version of Pool of Radiance, the code wheel is also used for some in-game puzzles. For example, in Sokol Keep the player discovers some parchment with elvish runes on it that require use of the code wheel to decipher; this is optional however, but may be used to avoid some combat with undead if the decoded words are said to them. In the NES version, the elvish words are given to the player deciphered without the use of the code wheel, as the NES release did not include a code wheel.

Plot

Setting

Pool of Radiance takes place in the Forgotten Realms fantasy world, in and about the city of Phlan. This is located on the northern shore of the Moonsea along the Barren River, between Zhentil Keep and Melvaunt. The party begins in the civilized section of "New Phlan" that is governed by a council. This portion of the city hosts businesses, including shopkeepers who sell holy items for each temple's worshipers, a jewelry shop, and retailers who provide arms and armor. A party can also contract with the clerk of the city council for various commissions; proclamations fastened to the halls within City Hall offer bits of information to aid the party. These coded clues can be deciphered by using the Adventurer's Journal, included with the game.

There are three temples within Phlan, each dedicated to different gods. Each temple can heal those who are wounded, poisoned, or afflicted, and can fully restore deceased comrades for a high price. The party can also visit the hiring hall and hire an experienced NPC adventurer to accompany the party. Encounters with NPCs in shops and taverns offer valuable information. Listening to gossip in taverns can be helpful to characters, although some tavern tales are false and lead characters into great danger.

Plot summary
The ancient trade city of Phlan has fallen into impoverished ruin. Now only a small portion of the city remains inhabited by humans, who are surrounded by evil creatures. To rebuild the city and clean up the Barren River, the city council of New Phlan has decided to recruit adventurers to drive the monsters from the neighboring ruins. Using bards and publications, they spread tales of the riches waiting to be recovered in Phlan, which draws the player's party to these shores by ship.

At the start of the game, the adventurers' ship lands in New Phlan, and they receive a brief but informative tour of the civilized area. They learn that the city is plagued with a history of invasions and wars and has been overtaken by a huge band of humanoids and other creatures. Characters hear rumors that a single controlling element is in charge of these forces. The characters begin a block-by-block quest to rid the ruins of monsters and evil spirits.

Beyond the ruins of old Phlan, the party enters the slum area—one of two quests immediately available to new parties. This quest requires the clearing of the slum block and allows a new party to quickly gain experience. The second quest is to clear out Sokol Keep, located on Thorn Island. This fortified area is inhabited by the undead, which can only be defeated with silver weapons and magic. The characters' adventure is later expanded to encompass the outlying areas of the Moonsea region. Eventually, the player learns that an evil spirit named Tyranthraxus, who has possessed an ancient dragon, is at the root of Phlan's problems. The characters fight Tyranthraxus the Flamed One in a climactic final battle.

History

Development
Pool of Radiance was the first official game based on the Advanced Dungeons & Dragons rules. The scenario was created by TSR designers Jim Ward, David Cook, Steve Winter, and Mike Breault, and coded by programmers from Strategic Simulations, Inc's Special Projects team. The section of the Forgotten Realms world in which Pool of Radiance takes place was intended to be developed only by SSI. The game was created on Apple II and Commodore 64 computers, taking one year with a team of thirty-five people. This game was the first to use the game engine later used in other SSI D&D games known as the "Gold Box" series. The SSI team developing the game was led by Chuck Kroegel. Kroegel stated that the main challenge with the development was interpreting the AD&D rules to an exact format. Developers also worked to balance the graphics with gameplay to provide a faithful AD&D feel, given the restrictions of a home computer. In addition to the core AD&D manuals, the books Unearthed Arcana and Monster Manual II were also used during development. The images of monsters were adapted directly from the Monster Manual book. The game was originally programmed by Keith Brors and Brad Myers, and it was developed by George MacDonald. The game's graphic arts were by Tom Wahl, Fred Butts, Darla Marasco, and Susan Halbleib.

Pool of Radiance was released in June 1988; it was initially available on the Commodore 64, Apple II series and IBM PC compatible computers. A version for the Atari ST was also announced.  The Macintosh version was released in 1989. The Macintosh version featured a slightly different interface and was intended to work on black-and-white Macs like the Mac Plus and the Mac Classic. The screen was tiled into separate windows including the game screen, text console, and compass. Graphics were monochrome and the display window was relatively small compared to other versions. The Macintosh version featured sound, but no music. The game's Amiga version was released two years later. The PC 9800 version  in Japan was fully translated (like the Japanese Famicom version) and featured full-color graphics. The game was ported to the Nintendo Entertainment System under the title Advanced Dungeons & Dragons: Pool of Radiance, released in April 1992. The NES version was the only version of the game to feature a complete soundtrack, which was composed by Seiji Toda, as he was signed to the publisher, Pony Canyon's record label at the time. The same soundtrack can be found on the PC-9801 version. The Amiga version also features some extra music, while most other ports contain only one song that plays at the title screen.

The original Pool of Radiance game shipped with a 28-page introductory booklet, which describes secrets relating to the game and the concepts behind it. The booklet guides players through the character creation process, explaining how to create a party. The game also included the 38-page Adventurer's Journal, which provides the game's background. The booklet features depictions of fliers, maps, and information that characters see in the game.

Sequels and related works 

Pool of Radiance was the first in a four-part series of computer D&D adventures set in the Forgotten Realms campaign setting. The others were released by SSI one year apart: Curse of the Azure Bonds (1989), Secret of the Silver Blades (1990), and Pools of Darkness (1991). The 1989 game Hillsfar was also created by SSI but was not a sequel to Pool of Radiance. Hillsfar is described instead, by the reviewers of Dragon, as "a value-added adventure for those who would like to take a side trip while awaiting the sequel". A player can import characters from Pool of Radiance into Hillsfar, although the characters are reduced to their basic levels and do not retain weapons or magical items. Original Hillsfar characters cannot be exported to Pool of Radiance, but they can be exported to Curse of the Azure Bonds. A review for Curse of the Azure Bonds in Computer Gaming World noted that "you can transfer your characters from Pool of Radiance and it's a good idea to do so. It will give you a headstart in the game".

GameSpot declared that Pool of Radiance, with its detailed art, wide variety of quests and treasure, and tactical combat system, and despite the availability of only four character classes and the low character level cap, "ultimately succeeded in its goal of bringing a standardized form of AD&D to the home computer, and laid the foundation for other future gold box AD&D role-playing games". Scott Battaglia of GameSpy said Pool of Radiance is "what many gamers consider to be the epitome of Advanced Dungeons & Dragons RPGs. These games were so great that people today are using MoSlo in droves to slow down their Pentium III-1000 MHz enough to play these gems". In March 2008, Dvice.com listed Pool of Radiance among its 13 best electronic versions of Dungeons & Dragons. The contributor felt that "the Pool of Radiance series set the stage for Dungeons & Dragons to make a major splash in the video game world".

The 1988 Dungeons & Dragons role-playing game module Ruins of Adventure was produced using the same adventure scenario as Pool of Radiance, using the same plot, background, setting, and many of the same characters as the computer game. The module thus contains useful clues to the successful completion of the computer missions. Ruins of Adventure contains four linked miniscenarios, which form the core of Pool of Radiance. According to the editors of Dragon magazine, Pool of Radiance was based on Ruins of Adventure, and not vice versa.

Novelization
In November 1989 a novelization of Pool of Radiance the video game, also called Pool of Radiance, was written by James Ward and Jane Cooper Hong, published by TSR. The novel is set in the Forgotten Realms setting based on the Dungeons & Dragons fantasy role-playing game. Dragon described the novel's plot: "Five companions find themselves in the unenviable position of defending the soon-to-be ghost town against a rival possessing incredible power". This book was the first in a trilogy, followed by Pools of Darkness and Pool of Twilight.

Re-release 
GOG.com released Pool of Radiance and many Gold Box series games digitally on August 20, 2015, as a part of Forgotten Realms: The Archives -  Collection Two.

Reception

SSI sold 264,536 copies of Pool of Radiance for computers in North America, three times that of Heroes of the Lance, an AD&D-licensed action game SSI also released that year. It became by far the company's most successful game up to that time; even its hint book outsold any earlier SSI game. It spawned a series of games, which combined to sell above 800,000 copies worldwide by 1996.

In Computer Gaming Worlds preview of Pool of Radiance in July 1988, the writer noted a sense of deja vu. He described the similarity of the game's screen to earlier computer RPGs. For example, the three-dimensional maze view in the upper-left window was similar to Might & Magic or Bard's Tale, both released in the mid-1980s. The window with a listing of characters was featured in 1988's Wasteland; and the use of an active character to represent the party was part of Ultima V. The reviewer also noted that the design approach for game play was closer to SSI's own Wizard's Crown than to the other games in the genre.

Pool of Radiance received positive reviews. G.M. called the game's graphics "good" and praised its role-playing and combat aspects. They felt that "roleplayers will find Pools is an essential purchase, but people who are solely computer games oriented may hesitate before buying it [...] it will be their loss". Tony Dillon from Commodore User gave it a score of 9 out of 10; the only complaint was a slightly slow disk access, but the reviewer was impressed with the game's features, awarding it a Commodore User superstar and proclaiming it "the best RPG ever to grace the C64, or indeed any other computer". Issue #84 of the British magazine Computer + Video Games rated the game highly, saying that "Pools is a game which no role player or adventurer should be without and people new to role playing should seriously consider buying as an introductory guide". Another UK publication, The Games Machine, gave the game an 89% rating. The reviewer noted that the third-person arcade style combat view is a great improvement for SSI, as they had traditionally incorporated simplistic graphics in their role-playing games. The reviewer was critical that Pool of Radiance was not original in its presentation and that the colors were a little drab, but concluded that the game is "classic Dungeons & Dragons which SSI have recreated excellently". A review from Zzap was less positive, giving the game a score of 80%. The reviewer felt that the game required too much "hacking, slicing and chopping" without enough emphasis on puzzle solving. The game was awarded 49% for its puzzle factor.

Three reviewers for Computer Gaming World had conflicting reactions. Ken St. Andre—designer of the Tunnels & Trolls RPG—approved of the game despite his dislike of the D&D system, praising the art, the mixture of combat and puzzles, and surprises. He concluded as "take it from a 'rival' designer, Pool of Radiance has my recommendation for every computer fantasy role-playing gamer". Tracie Forman Hicks, however, opined that over-faithful use of the D&D system left it behind others like Ultima and Wizardry. She also disliked the game's puzzles and lengthy combat sequences. Scorpia also disliked the amount of fighting in a game she otherwise described as a "well-designed slicer/dicer", concluding that "patience (possibly of Job) [is] required to get through this one". Shay Addams from Compute! stated that experienced role-playing gamers "won't find anything new here", but recommended it to those who "love dungeons, dragons, and drama". In their March 1989 "The Role of Computers" column in Dragon magazine #143, Hartley, Patricia, and Kirk Lesser (often called "The Lessers") gave Pool of Radiance a three-page review. The reviewers praised Pool of Radiance as "the first offering that truly follows AD&D game rules", calling it a "great fantasy role-playing game" that "falls into the must-buy category for avid AD&D game players". The reviewers advised readers to "rush out to your local dealer and buy Pool Of Radiance". They considered it SSI's flagship product, speculating that it would "undoubtedly bring thousands of computer enthusiasts into the adventure-filled worlds of TSR". The Dragon reviewers criticized the "notoriously slow" technology of the C64/128 system but added that the C64/128 version would become nearly unplayable without a software-based fastloader utility which Strategic Simulations integrated into the game. Conversely, the reviewers felt that the DOS version was extremely fast, so much so that they had to slow the game operation down in order to read all the on-screen messages. They found that the DOS version played at twice the speed of the C64/128 version when using the Enhanced Graphics Adapter (EGA) graphics mode.

Alex Simmons, Doug Johns, and Andy Mitchell reviewed the Amiga version of Pool of Radiance for Amiga Action magazine in 1990, giving it a 79% overall rating. Mitchell preferred the game Champions of Krynn, which had been released by the time the Amiga version of Pool of Radiance became available; he felt that Pool of Radiance was "more of the same" when compared to Champions, but was less playable and with more limited actions for players. Simmons felt that Pool of Radiance looked primitive and seemed less polished when compared with Champions of Krynn; he felt that although Pool was not up to the standard of Champions, he said it was still "a fine little game". Johns, on the other hand, felt that Pool of Radiance was well worth the wait, considering it very user-friendly despite being less polished than Champions of Krynn.

Pool of Radiance was well received by the gaming press and won the Origins Award for Best Fantasy or Science Fiction Computer Game of 1988. For the second annual "Beastie Awards" in 1989, Dragons readers voted Pool of Radiance the most popular fantasy role-playing game of the year, with Ultima V as the runner-up. The Apple II version was the most popular format, the PC DOS/MS-DOS came in a close second, and the Commodore 64/128 got the fewest votes. The primary factor given for votes was the game's faithfulness to the AD&D system as well as the game's graphics and easy-to-use user interface to activate commands. Pool of Radiance was also selected for the RPGA-sponsored Gamers' Choice Awards for the Best Computer Game of 1989. In 1990 the game received the fifth-highest number of votes in a survey of Computer Gaming World readers' "All-Time Favorites".

Allen Rausch, writing for GameSpy's 2004 retrospective "A History of D&D Video Games", concluded that although the game "certainly had its flaws (horrendous load times, interface weirdness, and a low-level cap among others), it was a huge, expansive adventure that laid a good foundation for every Gold Box game that followed". In 1994, PC Gamer US named Pool of Radiance the 43rd best computer game ever.

IGN ranked Pool of Radiance No. 3 on their list of "The Top 11 Dungeons & Dragons Games of All Time" in 2014. Ian Williams of Paste rated the game #5 on his list of "The 10 Greatest Dungeons and Dragons Videogames" in 2015.

See also
 Pool of Twilight
 Pool of Radiance: Ruins of Myth Drannor

References

External links
 
 
 Dragonbait's Pool of Radiance page, screenshots, info and pics of the original Pool of Radiance (1988)
 Pool of Radiance at Game Banshee - Contains a walkthrough and many in-depth specifics about the game
 Images of Pool of Radiance package, manual and screen for Commodore 64 version
 Pool of Radiance Interactive Code Wheel at oldgames.sk
Review in Compute!'s Gazette
Review in Info

1988 video games
Amiga games
Apple II games
Classic Mac OS games
Commodore 64 games
DOS games
Fantasy video games
Forgotten Realms video games
Gold Box
NEC PC-9801 games
Nintendo Entertainment System games
Origins Award winners
Role-playing video games
Sharp X1 games
Strategic Simulations games
Tactical role-playing video games
Ubisoft games
U.S. Gold games
Video games developed in the United States
Video games featuring protagonists of selectable gender
Video games with oblique graphics